Slow Burn is a 1989 film directed by John Eyres and starring Ivan Rogers,  William Smith, Anthony James and Stephen M.D. Chang. A veteran cop's partner is killed by a Mafia hitman, and he goes after him. Also on the trail of the hitman is a rookie cop who has his own personal reasons for pursuing him.

Story
A veteran cop has the task of preventing two rival criminal organizations from warring with each other. The two organizations happen to be the Mafia and the Triads. Besides this, the cop is also pursuing a hitman who is also being pursued by a less experienced cop. The veteran cop has no idea that rookie cop who has put himself in a close position to the hit man's boss is after the same target. The Mafia don was played  by William Smith and the hitman  Emilio Renzetti played by Anthony James.

Personnel

Cast
 Ivan Rogers ... Murphy 
 William Smith ... Antonio Scarpelli 
 Anthony James  ... Renzetti 
 Scott Anderson   ... Gino 
 Melissa J. Conroy   ... Lisa 
 Thom Schioler   ... Babe 
 Stephen M.D. Chang ... Sun Cheng 
 Don Kline  ... Corigliano 
 Mervon Bowman   ... Drug Dealer 
 William Britos   ... Drug Dealer 
 Frank Wilson  ... Captain Fahey 
 Paul McLean  ... Patterson  
 Michael Tiernan ... O'Brien 
 Gerry Vivash   ... Petrie 
 Keith Beardwood   ... Silverman

Crew
 Steven Lister ... Screenwriter 
 Geoff Griffiths ... Producer
 John Eyres ... Director, producer, executive producer
 John A Curtis ... Executive producer
 Zafar Malik ... Executive producer
 Nathaniel Massey ... Director Of Photography
 Alan M Trow ... Camera Operator

Technical and release information
Slow Burn was released in Belgium in 1990 on Excalibur Video. One piece of movie-related material bears the line, "In Chinatown, The Only Thing That Runs Deeper Than Tradition Is Blood".

References

External links
 Imdb: Slow Burn

1989 action films
1989 films
American action films
1980s English-language films
1980s American films